Gauri Sandip Gokhale (born 5 May 1984) is a Maharashtrian cricketer. She played for Mumbai and West zone. She has played 34 limited over and 9 Women's Twenty20 matches.

References 

1984 births
Mumbai women cricketers
West Zone women cricketers
Living people
Place of birth missing (living people)